Dolnji Slaveči is a village in the Municipality of Grad in the Prekmurje region of northeastern Slovenia.

Name
The name Dolnji Slaveči (literally, 'lower Slaveči') contrasts with the name Gornji Slaveči (literally, 'upper Slaveči'), a village in the neighboring Municipality of Kuzma. Gornji Slaveči lies about  higher in elevation than Dolnji Slaveči.

Notable people
Notable people that were born or lived in Dolnji Slaveči include:
Miklós Küzmics (1737–1804), Hungarian Slovene writer and translator
Anton Vratuša (1915–2017), politician and diplomat

References

External links
Dolnji Slaveči on Geopedia

Populated places in the Municipality of Grad